R. Thyagarajan may refer to:
 R. Thyagarajan (director)
 R. Thyagarajan (industrialist)
 R. Thiyagarajan, politician